Airwolf is an American action military drama television series that centers on a high-technology military helicopter, code-named Airwolf, and its crew. The show follows them as they undertake various exotic missions, many involving espionage, with a Cold War theme. It was created by Donald P. Bellisario and was produced over four seasons, running from January 22, 1984, until August 7, 1987.

The main cast for seasons one through three consisted of Jan-Michael Vincent, Ernest Borgnine, Alex Cord, Deborah Pratt (who left after season 2 when Bellisario left the series), and Jean Bruce Scott (who was added as a regular in seasons two and three).  The program originally aired on CBS and was canceled after the third season.  USA Network picked up the show for a fourth season that was completely recast with only Jan-Michael Vincent having a minor role in the first episode.  The fourth season was filmed in Canada, with the aerial scenes relying heavily on stock footage or repeated footage from the first three seasons.

The show's distinctive musical score, which was originally orchestral, but shifted to more synthesizer-based arrangements early in the second season, was composed and conducted mainly by Sylvester Levay. Udi Harpaz conducted the scores for many later second- and third-season episodes.

Series synopsis

The fictional Airwolf is described as an advanced prototype supersonic helicopter with stealth capabilities and a formidable arsenal.  Airwolf was designed by Charles Henry Moffet (David Hemmings)—a genius with a psychopathic taste for torturing and killing women—and built by "the Firm", a division of the Central Intelligence Agency (a play on the term "the Company", a nickname for the CIA). As the series begins, Moffet and his crew steal Airwolf during a live-fire weapons test. During the theft, Moffet opens fire on the Firm's bunker, killing a United States Senator and seriously injuring Firm deputy director Michael Coldsmith-Briggs III (code name "Archangel"). Moffet takes Airwolf to Libya, where he begins performing acts of aggression—such as sinking an American destroyer—as a service for Khaddafi, in exchange for giving Moffet sanctuary on Libyan soil.

Archangel recruits the reclusive Stringfellow Hawke (Vincent), a former test pilot during the development of Airwolf, to recover the gunship. Archangel leaves his assistant Gabrielle Ademaur (Belinda Bauer)—who becomes Hawke's love interest—at Hawke's cabin to brief him for his mission. A week later, after an undercover operative in Libya is killed in the line of duty, Gabrielle is sent in undercover and Hawke is sent in sooner than originally planned. With the assistance of pilot and father figure Dominic Santini (Borgnine), Hawke finds and recovers Airwolf, but Gabrielle is tortured and killed by Moffet. Hawke obliterates Moffet with a hail of missiles from Airwolf before returning to the United States. Instead of returning the gunship, Hawke and Santini booby-trap Airwolf and hide it in "the Lair", a large natural cave in the remote "Valley of the Gods" (actually filmed in visually similar Monument Valley). Hawke refuses to return Airwolf until the Firm can find and recover his brother, St. John (Christopher Connelly), who has been missing in action since the Vietnam War. To obtain access to Airwolf, Archangel offers Hawke protection from other government agencies who might try to recover Airwolf; in return, Hawke and Santini must fly missions of national importance for the Firm.

The Firm, during the first three seasons, served as both ally and enemy for Hawke and Santini; when an opportunity to seize Airwolf presented itself, Firm operatives often took it. The first season of the series was dark, arc driven, and quite reflective of the contemporary Cold War, with the Firm personnel distinctly dressed in white, implicitly boasting that "wearing white hats" distinguished them as good instead of evil. Hawke remained unconvinced, and Santini was skeptical, also; this was explained in the season-one episode "Daddy's Gone a Hunt'n". Early episodes frequently detailed the efforts of the United States government to recover Airwolf from Hawke, who is officially charged with having stolen it. Because CBS wanted to make the series more family oriented, the program was transformed during season two into a more light-hearted show, with Hawke and Santini portrayed as cooperative partners with the Firm. This persisted into the fourth season with the newly introduced "Company" and the new crew of Airwolf.

Cast

Seasons 1 through 3

Stringfellow "String" Hawke (Jan-Michael Vincent): When Stringfellow Hawke was ten, he and his parents were involved in a boating accident. He was rescued by his brother St John, but their parents drowned. After the death of his parents and the subsequent death of his girlfriend in a car crash, Stringfellow grew to believe that anyone he loved was destined to die tragically. In a U.S. Army mission during the Vietnam War, Stringfellow was separated from St. John; Stringfellow was rescued, but St. John was not. St. John was subsequently listed as M.I.A., causing Stringfellow to further withdraw from society. Stringfellow had a Master's degree in applied physics and, while often hot tempered, could be pragmatic. An avid fisherman, Stringfellow ate fish, but refused to eat red meat; he also refused to wear underwear. Stringfellow lived in seclusion in a log cabin by Lake Hemet (outside Los Angeles) with his Bluetick Coonhound "Tet" (named after the 1968 communist Tet Offensive), where he serenaded eagles on his priceless Stradivarius cello. Hawke had a remarkable collection of rare paintings, which his grandfather collected for his grandmother.

In 1982, Stringfellow served as a test pilot for Airwolf during its development program. As he was one of several pilots to fly Airwolf, the Firm recruited him to recover Airwolf after its designer, Doctor Charles Henry Moffet, absconded with it and took it to Libya. With the assistance of Dominic Santini, Hawke recovered Airwolf. Upon returning to the United States, the Firm failed to provide Stringfellow with new information regarding St. John. In retaliation, Hawke and Santini hid Airwolf, vowing not to return it until St. John was found. In return for protection from the government, Stringfellow piloted Airwolf on national security missions for the Firm. In the first episode of Season 4, Stringfellow was gravely wounded by an explosion, but was carried from the hospital (with an unknown outcome) by his recently returned brother, St. John.

Dominic "Dom" Santini (Ernest Borgnine): Santini was born and raised on the fictional Caribbean island nation of San Remo. Santini was of Italian-American descent and was bilingual, speaking both English and Italian fluently. A ladies' man in his youth, Dominic was forced to marry Lila, a young woman from a wealthy family, when she falsely claimed to be carrying his child (she would not truly become pregnant until years after their marriage). Though Lila left Dominic and took their daughter, Sally Ann, when Sally was 7, Dominic always kept his cottage in San Remo in the hope that Sally would return. Sally Ann followed a "jet set" existence focused on the casino in San Remo; Lila used Sally to provide her with male companionship. Sally Ann Santini died of a drug overdose in 1984, which devastated Dominic. Weeks later, Lila was murdered by San Remo's criminal element while attempting to blackmail the owner of San Remo's casino; when Dominic was arrested for her murder, Stringfellow helped bring the guilty parties to justice and used Airwolf to destroy the casino. Santini's other known relatives include his younger brother Tony Santini and Tony's daughter (Dominic's niece) Jo Santini, who becomes an important supporting character on the series during its fourth and final season. Dominic also has another niece, Holly Mathews, who suffers from a delusional emotional illness and nearly causes a disaster for her uncle and his friends during the Season 2 episode "The Truth About Holly."

Santini was a veteran of World War II and the Korean War, serving as a combat aviator for the U.S. Army in both conflicts. During his wartime experiences, Santini became a good friend of fellow American military aviator Alan B. Hawke. After Hawke and his wife were killed in a boating accident, Santini raised the Hawkes' two young sons. After St John Hawke went missing in action during the Vietnam War, Santini and Stringfellow Hawke dedicated themselves to the operation of Santini Air, a Van Nuys, California-based air charter service founded and owned by Santini that specializes in performing aerial stunts for Hollywood film productions.

Santini served as flight engineer on Airwolf, with Stringfellow as pilot and aircraft commander. When necessary, Santini would also occasionally take Hawke's place as Airwolfs pilot. Santini had great admiration and fondness for the elegant and sleek espionage aircraft, which he affectionately dubbed "the Lady". He harbored a distrust of the Firm, especially its deputy director Michael Coldsmith-Briggs III, who was codenamed "Archangel" but whom Santini derisively termed "Mister Clean".

In 1987, in the first episode of Season 4, Dominic was killed in the same helicopter explosion that also severely injured Stringfellow Hawke. This explosion was caused by an act of sabotage by Santini's and Hawke's enemies.Michael Coldsmith-Briggs III (Alex Cord): Codenamed "Archangel", Coldsmith-Briggs was the Firm's point man on the Airwolf project. He was present at the weapons test where Moffet stole Airwolf and used the gunship's weaponry to destroy the Firm's bunker. As a result of the attack, Archangel suffered injuries to his left arm and leg, and lost the sight in his left eye (which he usually covered with either a black eyeglass lens or a white patch). His leg injuries left him with a limp, for which he used a silver-handled cane. Archangel routinely wore white three-piece suits with a white tie and a white Panama hat, which was a standard uniform for operatives of the Firm.

Archangel recruited Stringfellow to recapture Airwolf, seizing Stringfellow's art collection (allegedly at the insistence of the Firm) to ensure his participation. After Stringfellow refused to return Airwolf, Archangel brokered a deal by which he would provide government assistance for Airwolf (and Stringfellow's quest to find St. John) in exchange for the use of Airwolf on missions of national importance. Though he was usually the man dispatching Airwolf on missions, Archangel occasionally served as flight engineer on Airwolf.  At the beginning of Season 4, it was explained that Archangel was suddenly (and unexpectedly) reassigned to the Middle East.  This was because of the previously mentioned recasting for the final season, and he was not mentioned for the remainder of the series.Marella (Deborah Pratt): Appearing as a guest star in several episodes through out seasons one and two, Marella often assisted Archangel, including piloting him to Hawke's cabin.  Marella had doctorates in Aeronautical Engineering, Electronic Engineering, Psychology, Microbiology, and French Literature, and was one year away from completing her Medical Doctorate as of the episode "Fallen Angel." Marella was last seen in the final episode of Season 2, "Short Walk to Freedom."  Pratt left the show after the second season when her then husband Bellisario left the show due to ongoing conflicts between his vision for the series and CBS's vision. In season three, Marella was replaced by a series of minor characters.Caitlin O'Shannessy (Jean Bruce Scott): A helicopter pilot for the Texas Highway Patrol, Caitlin first crossed paths with Airwolf when the gunship prevented her from being assaulted by four rednecks during the events of the Season 2 episode "Sweet Britches". After saving Stringfellow from a corrupt sheriff (and, in turn, being saved by Airwolf from being assaulted again), Caitlin tracked Stringfellow to Santini Air. Santini hired Caitlin, who had left the Highway Patrol, as a pilot for Santini Air. After initially covering up the existence of Airwolf, the events of Season 2 episode "Fallen Angel" resulted in her being added to the Airwolf crew, serving as either a pilot or flight engineer (as the situation required). Caitlin was never mentioned in Season 4.

Season 4St. John  Hawke (Barry Van Dyke): Brother of Stringfellow, and raised by Santini after the death of his parents. Van Dyke took over the role from Christopher Connelly, who portrayed the character in early CBS episodes. Santini taught both Stringfellow and St. John how to fly, and both brothers showed particular talent as U.S. Army aviators during the Vietnam War. In 1969, St. John was separated from Stringfellow and the rest of his unit during a mission. He would remain missing in action for the next 18 years, until he was suddenly located in a deep-cover CIA mission in 1987. Returning to the United States, he reunited with Stringfellow and, due to his brother's injuries, took over as pilot of Airwolf.Major Mike Rivers (Geraint Wyn Davies): Air Force Major tasked with locating Airwolf during the season 4 pilot episode "Blackjack."Jo Santini (Michele Scarabelli): Niece of Dominic Santini, Jo becomes both owner of Santini Air and custodian of Airwolf following the events of Season 4 episode "Blackjack".Jason Locke (Anthony Sherwood): Archangel's replacement as the Company agent who sends the Airwolf crew on their missions. Sometimes he even pilots Airwolf.

Production history

The series ran for 55 episodes on CBS in the United States in 1984 through 1986, and an additional 24 episodes, with a new cast and production company, aired on the USA Network in 1987, for a total of 79 episodes. A reedited version (produced in Germany) of the first episode was also released on home video in the UK and several other countries; it received a theatrical release in Indonesia. The show was broadcast in several international markets. Parts of the series were filmed in Monument Valley, Utah.

Magnum, P.I. connection
Creator Donald P. Bellisario first toyed with the idea of the adventures of an ace combat pilot in a third-season episode of Magnum, P.I. titled "Two Birds of a Feather" (1983), starring William Lucking, which, in turn, was inspired by several episodes of Bellisario's Tales of the Gold Monkey — "Legends Are Forever" and "Honor Thy Brother" (1982) — in which Lucking had played a similar character. The Magnum episode was intended as a backdoor pilot, but a series was not commissioned. Bellisario heavily reworked the idea, and the final result was Airwolf.

Seasons 2 and 3
To improve ratings, the studio wanted to add a regular female character and jettison the dark and moody tales of international espionage. This was accomplished at the start of the second season with the addition of Caitlin O'Shannessy (Jean Bruce Scott) and new stories that were domestic and more action-oriented. These changes proved unsuccessful, however, and while production costs remained high, creator Bellisario left both the studio and the series after Season 2. Bellisario's then-wife, Deborah Pratt, also left at that time (she was nearly three months pregnant with their daughter, Troian, as Season 2 drew to a close). Series star Jan-Michael Vincent's problems with alcoholism also contributed to the show's problems. Bernard Kowalski stepped in as executive producer for the third season, but the ratings remained low and the series was canceled by CBS.

Season 4
The USA Network funded a fourth season in 1987, to be produced in Canada by Atlantis and The Arthur Company (owned by Arthur L. Annecharico) in association with MCA. This was intended to increase the number of episodes to make the show eligible for broadcast syndication. The original cast was written out of the fourth season: Jan-Michael Vincent appears in a first transitional episode; a body double for Ernest Borgnine seen only from the back represented Santini, who was killed off in an explosion; Archangel was said to have suddenly been assigned overseas. "The Firm" was replaced by "the Company"; no mention was made of Caitlin. St. John Hawke, played by Barry Van Dyke, was suddenly revealed to be alive, having been working for many years as a deep undercover agent for American intelligence, contradicting characterizations in the previous three seasons. St. John replaced Stringfellow as the central character. Production moved to Vancouver, British Columbia, Canada on a reduced budget that was less than one-third of the original CBS budget. The production crew no longer had access to the original Airwolf helicopter, and all in-flight shots were recycled from earlier seasons; the original full-size studio mockup was re-dressed and used for all interior shots. Actress Michele Scarabelli, who played Jo Santini, said in a Starlog magazine interview that all 24 scripts were in place before the cast arrived, leaving the actors little room to develop their characters.

Airwolf helicopter

The flight-capable Airwolf helicopter was a cosmetically modified Bell 222, serial number 47085, sometimes unofficially called a Bell 222A. During filming of the series, the helicopter was owned by Jetcopters, Inc. of Van Nuys, California. The helicopter was eventually sold after the show ended and became an ambulance helicopter in Germany, where it crashed in a thunderstorm and was destroyed on June 6, 1992, killing all three crew members.

The concept behind Airwolf was a supersonic armed helicopter that could be disguised as a civilian vehicle—"a wolf in sheep's clothing". Andrew Probert designed the Airwolf uniform insignia patch worn by the flight crew members, a snarling bat-winged wolf's head wearing a sheepskin.

Regular castSeason 1 (CBS, Spring 1984) – two-hour pilot and ten additional episodes.
 Jan-Michael Vincent – Stringfellow Hawke (Captain, U.S. Army) (noted as 34 years of age in the 5th episode)
 Ernest Borgnine – Dominic Santini (the owner of Santini Air)
 Alex Cord – Michael Coldsmith Briggs III (Deputy Director of CIA division named "The Firm;" code name: Archangel)
 Deborah Pratt – Marella, Archangel's assistant Seasons 2–3 (CBS, 1984–1986) – two seasons of 22 episodes each.
 Vincent, Borgnine, Cord, Pratt (semi-regular, not season three), and
 Jean Bruce Scott – Caitlin O'Shannessy (former helicopter pilot of the Texas Highway Patrol)Season 4 (USA Network, Spring–Summer 1987) – 24 episodes, bringing the total hours to 80.
 Barry Van Dyke – St. John Hawke (reserve Major, U.S. Army)
 Michele Scarabelli – Jo Santini (inherited Santini Air from her uncle Dominic Santini after his death)
 Geraint Wyn Davies – Mike Rivers (Major, U.S. Air Force)
 Anthony Sherwood – Jason Locke (a core agent in the government agency called "The Company")
 William B. Davis – Newman (Locke's supervisor in the Company; Newman was played by Ernie Prentice just in the first episode, "Blackjack")

Music and soundtrack releases
Airwolf Themes is a two-CD soundtrack album for the television series released in February, 1999. The 73-minute soundtrack was created over a five-year period by a fan, Northern Ireland-based graphic designer Mark J. Cairns, in collaboration with original composer Levay, with a foreword by the series' creator, Bellisario.

After the original CBS series was cancelled in 1986, Cairns headed the International Airwolf Appreciation Association for nearly 10 years (1988–1998). He decided in early 1994 to produce his own high-quality soundtrack for the series using the episodic scores from the three seasons of the series to create the first 22 synthesizer-based tracks on the soundtrack, including various medleys and character themes. Only one thousand copies were made.

The first digital download-only EP release, entitled 'Airwolf Main Themes' was made available in September 2009. It contains four tracks based on variations of the series' Main Theme and was a preview of the future Extended Themes release.

A further 42-track, 146-minute, enhanced two-CD, limited-edition soundtrack album release called Airwolf Extended Themes (containing both a CD of the series' main theme variants, and a second CD of the episodic themes) was released on March 26, 2014. Bulgarian-Polish musician, Jan Michal Szulew, was the main arranger and orchestrator on the first CD, and Mark J. Cairns the arranger and overall producer of the second CD on this soundtrack. Two thousand copies were made.

Track listingsAirwolf Themes CD1 by Mark J. Cairns Main Theme – 3rd Season Opening titles (1:01)
 The American Dream (5:26)
 Annie Oakley (4:36)
 Dambreakers (3:24)
 Desperate Monday (4:43)
 Discovery / Hawke's Run (3:33)
 Fallen Angel (3:54)
 Fight Like a Dove / Bite of the Jackal – "Coming Down" (1:30)
 Fortune Teller (4:37)
 Hawke's Run / Kingdom Come – "Try and cut 'em off!" (2:23)
 The Hunted (2:41)
 HX1 (2:37)
 Inn at the End of the Road (3:37)
 Mad Over Miami / Prisoner of Yesterday– "South America" (3:42)
 Pilot / Moffett's Ghost – "Moffet's Theme" (6:13)
 Natural Born (2:09)
 Once a Hero (2:38)
 Main Theme – 1st Season Closing Titles (1:26)
 Short Walk to Freedom (6:19)
 Sins of the Past (2:16)
 Sweet Britches – "Opening Chase" (1:34)
 Main Theme – 2nd and 3rd Season Closing Titles (3:02)Airwolf Themes Special Bonus CD2 by Sylvester Levay Main Theme – Extended Aerial ("Red Star Test Run" – 'PILOT' Film Version) (3:35)
 Echos from the Past – Medley ("St John's Theme" / "Gabrielle's Theme") (3:33)
 1st Season – Medley (One Way Express / Mind of the Machine / "Moffet's Theme" / "Eagle's Serenade") (4:50)Airwolf Main Themes EP by Jan Michal Szulew 2nd–3rd Season Closing Main Theme (Extended) (06:00)
 2nd Season Minimalist Main Theme (Extended) (05:00)
 1st Season Synth Main Theme (Extended) (06:40)
 Minimalist Main Theme (Extended) (06:12)Airwolf Extended Themes – Main Themes CD1 by Jan Michal Szulew Airwolf Main Theme – Pilot – Journey to Red Star (TV) (Extended) (04:25)
 Airwolf Main Theme – Pilot – Kafir Palace Raid + Red Star Test Run (03:25)
 Airwolf Main Theme – Season 1 – Trailer (00:34)
 Airwolf Main Theme – Season 1 – Opening / Closing (Extended) (04:41)
 Airwolf Main Theme – Season 1 – Slow Main Theme (00:58)
 Airwolf Main Theme – Pilot, Season 1 – Synth Theme (06:35)
 Airwolf Main Theme – Season 2, Sweet Britches Trailer (00:33)
 Airwolf Main Theme – Season 2, Sweet Britches / Firestorm Intro (00:41)
 Airwolf Main Theme – Season 2, Sweet Britches / Firestorm (Extended) (04:11)
 Airwolf Main Theme – Season 2, Sweet Britches Epilogue (00:33)
 Airwolf Main Theme – Season 1 – Closing Theme (00:27)
 Airwolf Main Theme – Season 2, Firestorm Trailer (00:35)
 Airwolf Main Theme – Season 2, Fallen Angel / HX 1 (05:00)
 Airwolf Main Theme – Season 2, Aerial Theme (Extended) (06:05)
 Airwolf Main Theme – Season 3, Opening / Aerial Theme (Extended) (04:12)
 Airwolf Main Theme – Season 2 + 3, Generic Closing Theme (Extended) (06:00)
 Airwolf Main Theme – Pilot, Season 3 – Journey to Red Star (Movie) / Eagles Aerial Theme (Extended) (03:40)
 Airwolf Main Theme – Pilot, Season 1 + 2 – Minimalist (Extended) (06:10)
 Airwolf Main Theme – Pilot, Orchestral Suite (05:16)
 Airwolf Main Theme – Pilot, Closing Theme (00:51)
 Airwolf Main Theme – Season 2 + 3, Generic Closing (Regular length) (03:25)
 Airwolf Main Theme – Season 1 + 3, Special JMS Mix (04:41)Airwolf Extended Themes – Episodic Themes CD2 by Mark J. Cairns'''

 Airwolf II (08:00)
 And They Are Us (02:47)
 Condemned (02:39)
 Crossover (05:05)
 Echos From The Past – Cabin Epilogue (02:19)
 Sins Of The Past / Bite of The Jackal – Family Theme (02:42)
 Half-Pint – Le Van's Theme (01:55)
 Hawke's Run (04:35)
 Jennie – Operation Blackstone (01:59)
 Kingdom Come (05:16)
 Mind Of The Machine (03:47)
 Natural Born – Kevin's Theme + Aerials (04:36)
 Pilot (TV) – Blaze Theme (01:47)
 Pilot / Bite Of The Jackal – Eagle's Cello Theme + Synth Theme (02:32)
 Proof Through The Night – incl. Song of the Revolution "Poljuško Polje" (04:12)
 Santini's Millions (03:00)
 Severance Pay (03:32)
 The Horn Of Plenty (03:24)
 Santini's Millions / Hawke's Run – Trust Theme (03:00)
 Where Have All The Children Gone? (05:06)

Books
During the original series run, two books were published.  Both were written by Ron Renauld and are titled Airwolf and Trouble From Within, respectively.  A graphic novel was published in August 2015 entitled Airwolf Airstrikes, which recasts Archangel as a woman, and Dominic Santini's son, who is black.Airwolf Airstrikes Vol 1

Merchandise
 Airwolf Themes: 2CD Special Limited Edition (arrangement closely based on the original TV soundtrack)
 Airwolf: The Wonderweapon (German CD soundtrack)
 Airwolf Replica Helmet (fully functioning)
 Models of the Airwolf (helicopter), see link for list.

There was also a series of tie-in novels printed by Star, adapted from the scripts of various episodes, and coloring books for younger fans (printed in the UK by World Publishing), as well as a UK annual, which, despite being produced in 1985 (to cover 1986), was based around the first season. For several years, the children's TV comic / magazine Look-In ran an Airwolf comic strip to tie in with the original UK broadcast of the series.

Video games
 Airwolf (Commodore 64, Commodore 16), published by Elite. There were unrealized plans to rename the European-produced Airwolf C64 game as Fort Apocalypse 2.
 Airwolf (Amstrad CPC), published by Elite, popular in Europe.
 Airwolf (ZX Spectrum), published by Elite, popular in the UK and Europe.
 Airwolf (BBC Micro and Atari 8-bit family)Airwolf, ataricave.com Retrieved 2007-03-13. by Elite, adapted from Blue Thunder by Richard Wilcox Software. The helicopter is blue in the game. Seemingly, the only thing changed was the title. (Note: another BBC game, Superior Software's Codename: Droid, used Airwolfs rotor-like base-line on its opening screen. Whether royalties were paid is unknown. This is the only Airwolf connection with the game.)
 Airwolf (Arcade), by Kyugo Boueki.
 Airwolf (Family Computer), by Kyugo Boueki, released in Japan only.
 Airwolf (Nintendo Entertainment System), by Acclaim.
 Airwolf II (ZX Spectrum, Commodore 64, Commodore 16, Amstrad CPC and BBC Micro), published by Elite.
 Super Airwolf (Mega Drive/Genesis), by Kyugo Boueki, released in the U.S. as CrossFire.

Syndication
A syndication package does exist, and the show occasionally appears as re-runs. As of 2018, it was airing on getTV in America, while in the United Kingdom, ViacomCBS's Channel 5 company currently hold the rights, with the show broadcast back-to-back in late-night blocks on their Paramount Network.Airwolf four seasons are currently available on Peacock, NBC/Universal streaming service.

Home media
Universal Studios has released the first 3 seasons of Airwolf on DVD in regions 1, 2 & 4. Earlier releases consisted of single episodes on VHS (double episodes in the UK and some countries, edited together into "movie" format; later in the UK, a selection of first and season episodes were released by Playback on both VHS and DVD), most notably a United Kingdom 18 certificate cut of the pilot episode, presented as a standalone film (reshuffling and reworking many scenes, and removing much of the continuity ties with the following series, as well as incorporating footage from the first-season episode "Mad Over Miami", and with profanity that was not present in the aired version).

Season 4 was released in Region 1 on February 1, 2011.

On September 6, 2011, Shout! Factory released Airwolf: The Movie on DVD in Region 1 for the very first time. This single-disc set features the two-hour pilot tele-film fully restored and uncensored. It also contains special features including a new interview with Ernest Borgnine.

On March 8, 2016, it was announced that Mill Creek Entertainment had acquired the rights to the series and would release Airwolf - The Complete Series on DVD & Blu-ray for the very first time on May 3, 2016. They also re-released the first season on DVD on the same day.

Fabulous Films have released an all-new, High Definition Series 1–3 Blu-ray (Region B) box-set for the UK market during April 2014. The new HD transfers were created by Universal Studios.

Fabulous Films have since released single season Blu-ray (Region B) box sets, plus the equivalent DVD (Region 2) season box sets including, for the first time, a Canadian Airwolf II Season 4 set from the newly restored prints.

Koch Media in Germany have released both a complete four season Blu-ray (Region B) box set, plus the equivalent DVD (Region 2) season box sets. These are a dual-language (English / German) release, plus, for the first time, either English or German subtitles are available. This release was significant as Universal Studios provided Koch Media with a new, HD print for season 1 episode, "Bite Of The Jackal", to cure the unintended cuts Universal had made of this episode on the Fabulous Films' earlier version of the print. The Blu-ray release also contains the newly restored HD prints of Canadian Airwolf II Season 4 for the first time as well.

Universal Studios Japan released a Region A Blu-ray box set (seasons 1 to 3 only) with dual language (English / Japanese) on Christmas Day 2015. It contains new Japanese subtitles and the first time that a Region A HD release of Airwolf will work on USA Blu-ray players.

See also
 Blue Thunder (helicopter)
 Blue Thunder (film)
 Blue Thunder (TV series)
 The Highwayman Knight Rider Street Hawk Viper''

References

External links
 —television movie pilot (1984)
 —seasons 1–3 (1984–86)
 —season 4 (1987)
 
 Wired article on Airwolf replica for sale, blog.wired.com
 Airwolf on RotaryAction.com

 
American military television series
American spy drama television series
American spy thriller television series
Television series about the Central Intelligence Agency
1984 American television series debuts
1987 American television series endings
American television series revived after cancellation
American action television series
Aviation television series
Canadian action television series
CBS original programming
English-language television shows
Espionage television series
Super Bowl lead-out shows
Television series by Alliance Atlantis
Television series by Universal Television
Television series created by Donald P. Bellisario
Television shows filmed in Vancouver
Television shows filmed in Utah
USA Network original programming
1980s American drama television series
Military helicopters in fiction